The Miss International China or well known as "Miss China International" (traditional Chinese: 國際小姐選美大賽中國賽區; simplified Chinese: 国际小姐选美大赛中国赛区; pinyin: guójì xiǎojiě xuǎnměi dàsài Zhōngguó sàiqū) is an annual national Beauty pageant that selects China's representative to the Miss International pageant.

History
Miss International China was founded in 2002 by the Ministry of Tourism of the People's Republic of China. Current organization, Aiwan Group is the official Miss China International Franchise holder in China. In 2012 the Chinese representative ranked the Second Runner-up and it was the highest placement from China in Miss International history.

Titleholders
Color key

See also
Miss China World
Miss Universe China
Miss Earth China

References

External links
Official website
Miss International Lists (a)

Beauty pageants in China
Recurring events established in 2002
Chinese awards
China
2002 establishments in China
Annual events in China